Jean-François Senault (1599–1672) was a French Augustinian philosopher.

Works
 Paraphrase Svr Iob (1637)
 De l'usage des passions (1641) 
 Le Monarque, ou Le Devoir du Souverain (1661)

References
http://www.answers.com/topic/jean-fran-ois-senault-1

17th-century French philosophers
French Oratory
1599 births
1672 deaths
French male non-fiction writers
17th-century French Roman Catholic priests